Preston Farm may refer to:

Preston Farm (Fort Collins, Colorado), listed on the National Register of Historic Places in Larimer County, Colorado
Preston Farm (Kingsport, Tennessee), listed on the National Register of Historic Places in Sullivan County, Tennessee
Preston-Lafreniere Farm, Bolton, Vermont, listed on the National Register of Historic Places in Chittenden County, Vermont

See also
Preston House (disambiguation)
Preston Hall (disambiguation)